Nammunsan station is a defunct railway station on the Gyeongjeon Line in South Korea.

Defunct railway stations in South Korea